Vitellariopsis kirkii is a species of plant in the family Sapotaceae. It is found in Kenya and Tanzania.

References

kirkii
Vulnerable plants
Taxonomy articles created by Polbot
Taxa named by John Gilbert Baker